In the beginning of August 1916 three French and one British division with 45,000 men and 400 guns launched an offensive against the Bulgarian positions at Lake Dojran, defended by the 2nd Thracian Infantry Division. The attack began on 9 August with heavy artillery fire on the positions of the 27th Chepino Regiment and 9th Plovdiv Regiment. All four attacks that followed - on 10, 15, 16 and 18 August were repulsed by the Second Division and the Allies were forced to retreat to their original positions with heavy casualties.

Other sources state that the French took Tortoise Hill (Tortue) and Doldzeli, in total an area of 30 square km, but at a very high cost. The British 7th Battalion of the Oxfordshire & Buckinghamshire Light Infantry took Horseshoe Hill.

Notes 

Battles of the Balkans Theatre (World War I)
Battles of World War I involving Bulgaria
Battles of World War I involving France
Battles of World War I involving the United Kingdom
Military history of North Macedonia
1916 in Bulgaria
Vardar Macedonia (1912–1918)
Macedonian front
August 1916 events